Nguyễn Gia Từ (born 17 December 1989) is a Vietnamese footballer played as a centre-back for V.League 1 club Xi măng the vissai Ninh Bình  F.C..

References 

1989 births
Living people
Vietnamese footballers
Association football defenders
V.League 1 players
Vissai Ninh Bình FC players
Vietnam international footballers
People from Hà Tĩnh province